Mordellistena pararhenana is a species of beetle in the genus Mordellistena of the family Mordellidae. It was described by Ermisch in 1977 and can be found in countries like Croatia and Hungary.

References

Beetles described in 1977
pararhenana
Beetles of Europe